The Northeast National Salvation Society was an organization formed by exiles from Manchuria, (the  Northeast) in order to put pressure on the Chinese government of Chiang Kai-shek to end its policy of non resistance to the Empire of Japan that had invaded Manchuria after the Mukden Incident and to assist the volunteer armies, especially the Northeast People's Anti-Japanese Volunteer Army in Liaoning, led by Tang Juwu. One of its chief supporters was Zhang Xueliang who  privately supported this resistance, despite his public obedience to the government policy of non resistance.  Zhang was not publicly associated with the Society and never held office in it, but provided funds and allowed it to use his name when communicating with volunteer armies.

The society was dissolved in 1933, under pressure from Chinese government in Nanjing.

References

Anti-Japanese sentiment in China
Second Sino-Japanese War
History of Manchuria